Rock chalk may refer to:

 Chalk – commonly found carbonate rock (as opposed to gypsum sidewalk chalk)
 Rock Chalk, Jayhawk – a chant used at University of Kansas Jayhawks sporting events